Stefan  Grigorievich Samko (born March 28, 1941) is a mathematician active in the field of functional analysis, function spaces and operator theory. He is a retired professor of Mathematics at Algarve University and Rostov State University.

Career

Research activity
S. Samko has more than 260 research papers spread throughout the areas of,

Harmonic Analysis and Operator Theory in Variable Exponent Function Spaces;
Function spaces;
Potential type operators;
Hypersingualr integrals and the method of approximative inverse operators;
Fractional calculus of one and many variables;
Integral equations of the first kind (including multi-dimensional ones).

Teaching activity
He was the adviser for 21 PhD students, from Russia and Portugal. The complete list is:

Boris Rubin
Vladimir Nogin
Alexandre Skorikov	
Salaudin Umarkhadzhiev	
Alexandre Guinzbourg
Hamzat Murdaev†
Boris Vakulov
Anatolii Chuvenkov
Pavel Pavlov
Galina Emgusheva
Galina Kostetskaya
Taus Khamidova
Mahmadiar Yakhshiboev
Esmira Alisultanova
Anna Abramyan
Zarema Mussalaeva
Alexey Karapetyants
Elena Urnysheva
Alexandre Almeida
Rogério Cardoso
Humberto Rafeiro

Bibliography

References

External links

 Stefan Samko's home page

1941 births
Living people
Scientists from Rostov-on-Don
Soviet mathematicians
20th-century Portuguese mathematicians
20th-century Russian mathematicians
21st-century Russian mathematicians
Steklov Institute of Mathematics alumni
Mathematical analysts
Academic staff of the University of Algarve
Academic staff of Southern Federal University